The Day After Roswell is an American book about extraterrestrial spacecraft and the Roswell UFO incident. It was written by United States Army Colonel Philip J. Corso, with help from William J. Birnes, and was published as a tell-all memoir by Pocket Books in 1997, a year before Corso's death. The book claims that an extraterrestrial spacecraft crashed near Roswell, New Mexico, in 1947 and was recovered by the United States government who then sought to cover up all evidence of extraterrestrials.

Synopsis

The majority of the book is an account of Colonel Corso's claims that he was assigned to a secret government program that provided some material recovered from crashed spacecraft to private industry (without saying where the items came from) to reverse engineer them for corporate use. Corso was a Special Assistant to Lt General Arthur Trudeau, who headed Army Research and Development, and was in charge of the Foreign Technology Desk. In this position, he would take technological artifacts obtained from Russian, German and other foreign sources, and have American companies reverse engineer that technology. The book contends that several aspects of modern technology such as fiber optics and integrated circuits were developed by using information taken from the craft.

Colonel Corso also claimed the world was "at war" with extraterrestrials and that the Strategic Defense Initiative project was part of that campaign that was successfully concluded in Earth's favour.

Foreword in the book
When it was released, the book contained a foreword written by longtime U.S. Senator Strom Thurmond, for whom Corso had once served as an aide. Thurmond wrote, "He has many interesting stories to share with individuals interested in military history, espionage and the workings of our Government." The foreword did not mention anything about UFOs, since Thurmond had assumed the book was a straightforward memoir. When he learned about the book's contents, Thurmond stated, "I know of no such 'cover-up,' and do not believe one existed."

Liz Hartman, director of publicity for Pocket Books, said in the same New York Times article; “We absolutely stand by the book. It's a memoir.”

Versions of the book purchased today, for example electronic Kindle downloads from Amazon, still carry the Thurmond foreword.

Reception
The book appeared on The New York Times Best Sellers List for several weeks, and received both favorable and unfavorable reviews. Publishers Weekly advised, "[Corso's book] is only for the few special libraries that have made documenting the unconventional a collecting priority."

In 2001, The Guardian included the book in its list of "Top Ten literary hoaxes".

Media appearances
Corso was a guest on Art Bell's Dreamland radio show in 1997. Later that year on July 23, 1997 he appeared Coast to Coast AM and again was interviewed by Art Bell. This time, he was accompanied by Dr. John Alexander who represented that he had gone to Washington D.C. and gone to the National Archives and other records to verify the facts of Corso's public service. He indeed had served honorably as a Lieutenant Colonel under Lieutenant General Arthur Trudeau and worked in the White House for four years.

Editions
  (first edition)

See also 
 Potential cultural impact of extraterrestrial contact

References

Roswell incident
American non-fiction books
1997 non-fiction books